Stadio dei Fiori, is a multi-purpose stadium in Valdagno, Italy.  It is used mostly for football matches and hosts the home matches of Trissino-Valdagno in Serie D.  The stadium has a capacity of 6,500 spectators and meets Lega Pro criteria.

References

External links
:it:Stadio dei Fiori

Football venues in Italy
Multi-purpose stadiums in Italy